Nomen nescio, abbreviated to N.N., is used to signify an anonymous or unnamed person. From Latin nomen – "name", and nescio – "I do not know", it literally means "I do not know the name". The generic name Numerius Negidius used in Roman times was chosen partly because it shared initials with this phrase.

Usage
One use for this name is to protect against retaliation when reporting a crime or company fraud. In the Netherlands, a police suspect who refuses to give his name is given an "N.N. number." In Germany and Belgium, N.N. is also frequently seen in university course lists, indicating that a course will take place but that the lecturer is not yet known; the abbreviation in this case means nomen nominandum – "the name is to be announced". Thus, the meaning is different from the above definition and is the same as TBD (to be decided).

N. N. is commonly used in the scoring of chess games, not only when one participant's name is genuinely unknown but when an untitled player faces a master, as in a simultaneous exhibition. Another reason is to protect a known player from the insult of a painful defeat.

Genealogists often use the abbreviation to signify an unknown or partially unknown name (such as N.N. Jones).

It has increased in usage in online gaming as an insult to mean that someone is unknown within the community.

See also 

 Placeholder name
 List of placeholder names by language
 A. N. Other
 John Doe
Hudjefa

References 

Roman law
Anonymity pseudonyms
Latin words and phrases
Genealogy